The 1932 Sam Houston State Bearkats football team represented Sam Houston State Teachers College (now known as Sam Houston State University) as a member of the Lone Star Conference (LSC) during the 1932 college football season. Led by 10th-year head coach J. W. Jones, the Bearkats compiled an overall record of 2–6–1 with a mark of 1–4 in conference play, and finished fifth in the LSC.

Schedule

References

Sam Houston State
Sam Houston Bearkats football seasons
Sam Houston State Bearkats football